T. K. G. Neelamegam (born 27 September 1963), is an Indian politician and is Member of the Legislative Assembly of Tamil Nadu. representing Thanjavur. His father T.K. Govindan is a well known Politician and very close to the former chief minister M. Karunanithi and he is a senior leader of DMK. T. K. G. Neelamegam is the Thanjavur town secretary, and a member of Dravida Munnetra Kazhagam.

Elections contested

References 

Living people
Dravida Munnetra Kazhagam politicians
People from Thanjavur
1963 births
Tamil Nadu MLAs 2021–2026